"One for the Angels" is the second episode of the American anthology television series The Twilight Zone. It originally aired on October 9, 1959, on CBS.

Opening narration

Plot
Lew Bookman is a kindly sidewalk pitchman who sells and repairs toys, notions, and trinkets, and is adored by the neighborhood children. One day, Bookman is visited by Mr. Death, who tells him that he is to die at midnight of natural causes. Unable to dissuade Death by convincing him he has great achievements in the works that must be completed, Bookman eventually convinces him to wait until he has made his greatest sales pitch: "one for the angels". After Death has agreed to the extension and asks  when this grand pitch might take place, Bookman announces he is retiring, smug that he has successfully cheated Death. Death concedes Bookman has found a loophole in their agreement, but warns that someone else now has to die in his place. Death chooses Maggie, a little girl who lives in Bookman's apartment building and is a friend of his.

Maggie is hit by a truck and falls into a coma; Death intends to be in her room at the stroke of midnight to claim her. Bookman begs Death to take him instead, but Death is adamant; a deal is a deal. Bookman gets out his wares and begins to eloquently boost one item after another, making the greatest sales pitch of his life—one so great that he entices Death himself to buy item after item until all of the wares in his case are sold. With one minute remaining before midnight, he offers his "Piece de Resistance", he pitches himself as the ultimate manservant. Death is so moved, that midnight passes and he misses his appointment with Maggie. Maggie awakens and, as her doctor leaves the apartment and sees Bookman, he assures him that Maggie will live.

Death observes that by making that great sales pitch, Bookman has met the original terms of their deal. Now content and willing to accept his fate, Bookman leaves for Heaven with Death. He fetches his case of wares to bring with him, remarking that "you never know who might need something up there". He looks to Death, adding hopefully, "Up there?" and Death replies, "Up there, Mr. Bookman. You made it."

Closing narration

Preview for next week's story

Further reading

References

External links
 

The Twilight Zone (1959 TV series season 1) episodes
1959 American television episodes
Television episodes written by Rod Serling
Fiction set in 1960
Television episodes about personifications of death